The Cliffside Park School District is a comprehensive community public school district that serves students in pre-kindergarten through twelfth grade from Cliffside Park, in Bergen County, New Jersey, United States.

As of the 2021–22 school year, the district, comprised of five schools, had an enrollment of 3,074 students and 255.7 classroom teachers (on an FTE basis), for a student–teacher ratio of 12.0:1.

The district is classified by the New Jersey Department of Education as being in District Factor Group "B", the second lowest of eight groupings. District Factor Groups organize districts statewide to allow comparison by common socioeconomic characteristics of the local districts. From lowest socioeconomic status to highest, the categories are A, B, CD, DE, FG, GH, I and J.

Students from Fairview attend the district's high school as part of a sending/receiving relationship with the Fairview Public Schools.

Schools 
Schools in the district (with 2021–22 enrollment data from the National Center for Education Statistics) are:
Elementary schools
Number 3 School with 358 students in grades PreK-4
Barbara Bracco, Principal
Number 4 School with 485 students in grades K-5
Jaclyn Roussos, Principal
Number 5 School with 275 students in grades PreK-4
Dana Martinotti, Principal
Number 6 School / Cliffside Park Middle School with 692 students in grades 5-8
Robert Bargna, Principal
Mark Rindfuss, Middle School Principal
Cliffside Park High School with 1,192 students in grades 9-12
Lawrence Pinto, Principal

Administration
Core members of the district's administration are:
Michael Romagnino, Superintendent of Schools
Louis Alfano, Business Administrator / Board Secretary

Board of education
The district's board of education is comprised of nine members who set policy and oversee the fiscal and educational operation of the district through its administration; an additional representative is appointed to represent Fairview. As a Type II school district, the board's trustees are elected directly by voters to serve three-year terms of office on a staggered basis, with three seats up for election each year held in April; the district is one of 12 districts, out of more than 600 statewide, that still hold school elections in April.  The board appoints a superintendent to oversee the district's day-to-day operations and a business administrator to supervise the business functions of the district. As one of the districts with school elections in April, voters decide on passage of the annual school budget.

References

External links 
Cliffside Park School District

Cliffside Park School District, National Center for Education Statistics

Cliffside Park, New Jersey
New Jersey District Factor Group B
School districts in Bergen County, New Jersey